Minnyi Mintha was the common title for all Princes of the Blood of the Burmese monarchy (i.e. sons, grandsons, brothers and nephews of a sovereign), who were all assigned fiefdoms when they came of age, and promoted to this rank.

Specific ranks and titles for dynasty members
It was divided into four principal grades, as follows, awarded individually:
 The Great Deputy King: Maha Uparaja Anaudrapa Einshay Min, incorrectly termed Crown Prince by Europeans, and addressed as His Royal Highness.
 Viceroy or governor of a province: (territorial title) Bayin Khan, i.e. Viceroy, with the style of His Royal Highness.
 Great Princes, a maximum of eighteen at any one time, divided into nine great princes of the left and nine great princes of the right: Minthaya-gyi), together with the rank of Thado Min, i.e. Prince, with the style of His Royal Highness.
 Middle Princes, a maximum of eighteen at any one time, divided into nine middle princes of the left and nine middle princes of the right: Mintha-lat), together with the rank of Min Ye (Prince, with the style of His Royal Highness.

Specific titles were also used not by office, but by birth; however these were NOT indicative of the succession, for which there were no effective rules, a power struggle in the palace was the rule.
The eldest son of the sovereign, by his chief Queen: Shwe Kodaw-gyi Awratha, i.e. Prince with the style of His Royal Highness.
 younger sons of the sovereign, by his chief Queen: Shwe Kodaw-gyi Rajaputra, i.e. Prince with the style of His Royal Highness.
 sons of the sovereign, by his senior Queens: Shwe Kodaw-gyi, i.e. Prince with the style of His Royal Highness.
 sons of the sovereign, by his junior wives: Kodaw-gyi, i.e. Prince with the style of His Royal Highness.
 sons of a Prince, by a junior wife: Hteik Tin, i.e. Prince.

References

See also
Burmese royal titles

Burmese culture
Burmese royal titles
Noble titles